Tyla (born Timothy Taylor, 1960) is an English rock musician, best known for his work with The Dogs D'Amour as well as an extensive solo catalogue. As well as performing vocals, guitars and other instruments, he also illustrates the album covers in his own recognisable style.

The Dogs D'amour 

In 1982 Tyla was serving as guitarist for the band Bordello Boys. When vocalist Ned Christie joined the band he brought with him a change of name, which was the beginning of The Dogs D'Amour. On the back of the second of two recording sessions, The Dogs D'Amour were signed to Kumibeat Records in Finland.

The recording and release of The State We're' In was problematic. Ned Christie left the band prior to the recording, resulting in Tyla adopting the role of both guitars and vocals. Additionally, the production encountered a number of issues, most notably the album producer remixing everything to add synths, against the band's wishes. The album was released on vinyl in Finland but Kumibeat Records folded shortly after. The Kumibeat mix has never been released on CD or in any format outside of Finland. A cassette-sourced copy of the original mix has since been released, although has been criticised for its sound quality.

Following the Kumibeat saga, guitarist Dave Kusworth left the band and joined Nikki Sudden in Jacobites. Tyla rebuilt the band from scratch, adopting longtime guitarist Jo 'Dog' and returning drummer Bam, who had been around in the band's formative years. These three members form the basis of what would later come to be regarded as the band's 'classic' line-up, although long-time bassist Steve James didn't appear until 1987.

Two sessions in 1985 and 1986 formed the basis of (Un)authorised Bootleg Album, which was one of two releases that came out in 1988. It featured tracks which had been live staples in the run up to the release of the band's second official album In The Dynamite Jet Saloon. Although (Un)authorised Bootleg Album was originally only released in limited quantities on vinyl, it is still considered part of the band's official discography. Chronologically speaking, it is, unofficially, the band's second album.

The band's official second album In The Dynamite Jet Saloon, featured classic tracks such as 'Last Bandit' and 'How Come It Never Rains', which have become staples of both The Dogs D'Amour and Tyla's solo set-lists. For many people this was their introduction to the band.

In 1989 the band released their third official album A Graveyard of Empty Bottles. The album was more acoustic than any of their previous records. The band's then label, China Records, was unsure of this direction and restricted the album to only featuring eight songs. Demos and re-recordings of the omitted tracks have since emerged in later years on various releases.

Errol Flynn, titled King of the Thieves in the US for copyright reasons, returned to the style of In The Dynamite Jet Saloon. This was also true of 1990's Straight, which was the band's first album to be recorded in the USA

In 1991 the band famously split up on stage, with Tyla slashing his chest open with a bottle during the set. Following the split the label released a compilation Dog Hits & Bootleg, which also included the first CD pressing of (Un)Authorized Bootleg.

In 1993 the band reformed, minus Jo Dog, who was replaced by former Crybabys guitarist Darrell Bath. More Unchartered Heights of Disgrace was the only official record from this line-up.

The band broke up for a second time and, with the exception of a compilation entitled Skeletons in 1997, nothing was heard of the band until 1999 when Tyla announced that the band had once again reformed. The second reunion was prompted by a wave of Internet tribute sites that had appeared dedicated to the band in the late 1990s.

For the second reunion bassist Steve James sat out and was replaced by Bam's wife Share, who also contributed much to the backing vocals of Happy Ever After, released in 2000. The style of the album owes much to Tyla's solo albums in the late 90s, Libertine and Gothic. Indeed, Happy Ever After features a number of re-recorded songs and re-used riffs.

An album of demos from the Happy Ever After sessions, Seconds, was made available to members of the bands fanclub as part of the Dog's Dinner box set.

After a tour opening for Alice Cooper the band broke up again, this time for over ten years.

In 2013, Paul Hornby, drummer on the band's first album and onetime member of The Quireboys was discovered to be ill and The Dogs D'Amour reformed for a number of charity gigs. An EP of four new songs, entitled Cyber Recordings was also released.

The band members remain active on social media..

First solo period 

Tyla's first solo album, entitled The Life & Times of a Ballad Monger features all of the members of the 1993 line-up of The Dogs D'Amour, although the majority of the tracks are acoustic and feature just Tyla and Darrell Bath.

Combined with the fact that the songs were revealed to have been originally written for The Dogs D'Amour, this has led some to consider the work a release by The Dogs D'Amour in all but name.

Spike & Tyla's Hot Knives 

Following the collapse of the line-up responsible for The Life & Times of a Ballad Monger, Tyla began a project entitled Hot Knives with long-time friend Spike, from The Quireboys. The album featured both singers on vocals, including shared vocals and harmonies, somewhat of a rarity in Tyla's discography.

The album Flagrantly Yours received mixed reviews but remains a fan favourite. It was re-titled and re-released in 2005, minus the name Hot knives and also incorporating a second disc featuring an acoustic re-recording of the album.

In celebration of the life Paul Hornby, formerly a member of both The Dogs D'Amour and The Quireboys, the Hot Knives project was resurrected in 2013 with a show being recorded for DVD release in 2016.

On the back of this successful reunion, an album of new material from Spike And Tyla's Hot Knives entitled The Sinister Indecisions Of Frankie Gray And Jimmy Pallas was released 2016. This release included the aforementioned live DVD, the setlist of which also included various songs by originally recorded by both The Dogs D'Amour and The Quireboys.

Second solo period 

The line-up responsible for the Hot Knives project, minus Spike, went on to record two further albums which were released under the Tyla solo banner. Spike went on to form a new line up of The Quireboys in 2001.

Libertine and Gothic, since collated into a single double-album, contains material which arguably bares the closest stylistic similarity to The Dogs D'Amour. There has been speculation amongst fans that some of the songs from both releases were written for his former band. At least some of the songs had been written for the abandoned Hot Knives project, whilst others were entirely new compositions.

As with Tyla's first solo album, both releases contain both electric and acoustic material.

Tyla toured material from both albums in the late 90s, as well as playing hits by The Dogs D'Amour.

The Poet & The Dregen 

In 1999 Tyla collaborated with Dregen from Backyard Babies' as The Poet & The Dragon on a single album entitled Live… Somewhere in This World. The album remained unreleased until 2004.

Live… Somewhere in This World features a majority of songs by The Dogs D'Amour but also includes Backyard Babies tracks and one Tyla solo composition. Tyla also contributed a vocal line to the track 'Friends' on the Babies' Stockholm Syndrome album.

Third solo period 

Tyla's third solo period is characterised by experimentation in musical territory vastly different from his previous work. The majority of the work from this period falls into either singer-songwriter material of a mostly acoustic nature or loosely tinged industrial rock.

A number of acoustic tracks demo'd in 1997 were finally officially released in 1999 as Nocturnal Nomad, which remains a fan favourite. The album marked the first time Tyla had no backing band and is almost entirely acoustic. A live album entitled Acoustic Live was also made available at gigs around this period, although it has since become unavailable and is considered a much desired rarity.

A number of compilation albums, some featuring outtakes, re-recordings, and new songs, were released around the Nocturnal Nomad era.

After moving to Spain, 2001 saw the release of Lullabies For Tough Guys which, like Nocturnal Nomad, saw minimal outside collaboration. The album features a very raw production. Subsequent records would move in an increasingly electronic-orientated direction, including the use of a drum machine, bar the acoustic albums (which included two volumes of re-recorded songs from The Dogs D'Amour days).

Tyla as 'The Dogs D'amour' 

In the middle of his Third Solo Period Tyla released three albums under the name of The Dogs D'Amour.  Neither When Bastards Go To Hell, Let Sleeping Dogs..., or the live album Unleashed  feature any members from the "classic" line up of the band other than Tyla.

The material on both of the two studio albums is stylistically much closer to Tyla's solo material of the same period. Some fans consider these albums as solo efforts in all but name. This in spite of the fact that the live album Unleashed is composed almost entirely of songs from The Dogs D'Amour days.

'Tyla & The Dogs' 

Towards the end of the 2000s Tyla returned to England.

In 2009 he released the double album Bloody Hell Fire under the name Tyla & The Dogs, which was his first studio effort with a strong presence of other musicians since Gothic. Featuring a range of electric and acoustic compositions, the album marked a stylistic return to the days of Libertine and Gothic, though with more ambitious production values.

'Tyla Presents…' 

To mark the anniversary of The Dogs D'Amour's classic album In The Dynamite Jet Saloon Tyla used crowd sourced funding to re-recorded the album. The re-recorded album features a much rawer production than the original and also omits some tracks from the original in favour of songs from The State We're In  and (Un)Authorized Bootleg. Although the spine of the album says The Dogs D'Amour, the front cover is labelled 'Tyla Presents', creating a certain ambiguity as to whether it is intended to be considered a Tyla solo album or not.

In 2012 Tyla re-recorded A Graveyard of Empty Bottles. The new version featured all of the album's original eight songs, plus five others that were intended to be on the original release but omitted by the then label. Unlike  In The Dynamite Jet Saloon MMX, the production on this album is very layered, featuring intricate keyboards and new musical textures.

Both re-recordings feature no original members of The Dogs D'Amour except Tyla, but unlike When Bastards Go To Hell and Let Sleeping Dogs… they do not feature drum machines or industrial elements and include collaboration with other live musicians. However, like both of those albums, the style on these two recordings is more similar to Tyla's solo albums of the same period.

In 2014 Tyla announced his intention to re-record The Dogs D'Amour's first album The State We're In in its entirety and release it as a solo album. This has further prompted some fans to see both In The Dynamite Jet Saloon MMX and A Graveyard of Empty Bottles MMXII as solo re-recordings in all but name.

Tyla toured material from both re-recordings under the name The Dogs D'Amour, but also included many solo songs in the live set in 2011. In 2012, he played In the Dynamite Jet Saloon and A Graveyard of Empty Bottles live back-to-back.

The 'Tyla J. Pallas' era 

Quinquaginta, meaning 50 in Latin, was titled in light of Tyla's 50th birthday. It was the first album released under the name Tyla J. Pallas, although a number of the songs were electric re-recordings of songs from Bloody Hell Fire.

As early as the original recording of A Graveyard of Empty Bottles in 1989 Tyla had released both acoustic and electric versions of songs. With the release of Devil's Supper this idea was taken to its logical conclusion, with the album being released in both acoustic and electric versions in early 2013.

Later in 2013 Tyla released 'Charmed', an album reminiscent of his singer-songwriter period in that it features mostly acoustic and piano-based songs.

2014 saw the release of the re-recorded version of the first album by The Dogs D'Amour, The State We're in. The style of this recording differs quite substantially in places from the original album, which was besieged by production difficulties. Additionally an album of new material, entitled Another Day Abandoned in Pursuit of Pleasure, was released as well as two live albums Live In London MMXIII and Nights of the Ballad Monger, electric and acoustic respectively, making 2014 one of the busiest years in the Tyla discography.

Tyla announced his intention to not participate in any future studio releases with The Dogs D'Amour on Facebook, although an audio version of the 2014 DVD From Here Is An Eternity was briefly made available. A two disc compilation of his solo work, which included re-recordings of his 90s material and several remixes from his most recent albums was also released. Several cuts from this compilation also made their way to the box set A Treasury Of The King Outlaw.

Since the formation of The Tyla J. Pallas Band and Tyla's Dogs D'amour Tyla has continued to release solo recordings under the name Tyla J. Pallas. The releases continue to differ in style and scope.

The Chard Urton Blues Treasury and others 

Beginning in 2014 the first of what became a six volume series of blue-based compositions, collectively entitled The Chard Urton Blues Treasury, saw the light of day. The last album in the series came out in 2015, with the option to purchase all six in a special edition hand painted wooden box set also. Whilst a number of the songs on each of these albums are ostensibly rock-based, the general mood of the albums is much bluesier with a minimalist production compared to the likes of Devil's Supper or A Graveyard Of Empty Bottles MMXI.

Two further releases in 2015 continued the musical trajectory of The Chard Urton Blues Treasury project, entitled Gold Rings and Blanacing The Ships Of Honour. Of the two Gold Rings features a combination of bluesier more minimalist songs as well as others that are more akin to Tyla's early 2000s material.

Two albums worth of re-recorded songs by The Dogs D'Amour, XIII Shades Of Dog and XIII Shades Of Dog II, in new bluesy renditions were also released around this period.

Towards the end of 2015 Tyla announced his intention to re-record 1999's Nocturnal Nomad in its entirety as a full-band electric effort. Three lives shows in the UK, in which the album was to be played in its entirety, were announced to promote the release. Nocturnal Nomad: Electric was released in a number of editions in early 2016.

Though all of the releases were released under the Tyla J. Pallas brand, they appear to represent, with the exception of Gold Rings, a unity of style based more firmly in the blues.

The Tyla J. Pallas Band 

Formed of regular Tyla collaborators Gary Pennick on guitar, Simon Hansen on drums, and newcomer Matty James on bass The Extraordinary Thin Line between Love and Hate was released in mid-2016. The album consisted of ten new tracks and features a significantly more layered production compared with The Chard Urton Blues Treasury period. Keyboards, a harmonica, acoustic guitars, feature prominently.

A live album, featuring one cut from The Extraordinary Thin Line between Love and Hate as well as a number of renditions from the recently released electric edition of Nocturnal Nomad, was also released.

Tyla's Dogs D'amour 

Beginning in 2017, The Tyla J. Pallas Band was effectively re-branded as Tyla's Dog's D'amour, releasing the EP Homesick Angel. This was followed in 2018 by the album In Vino Veritas and another live album, entitled simply Live. A single Here Comes The Black Confetti, featuring unreleased tracks from the album sessions, was also released the same year. A remixed version of Homesick Angel was also made available digitally.

The 2015 re-recording of Nocturnal Nomad was re-branded under the new band monicker for sale through Cargo Records. The digital version, however, retains the original branding.

A new studio album and live album was due for release in late 2019.

Discography

The Dogs D'Amour

Spike and Tyla's Hot Knives

Albums 

Flagrantly Yours (1996)
Flagrantly Electrically Acoustically Yours (2005)
The Sinister Indecisions Of Frankie Gray And Jimmy Pallas (2016)

Live 

Flagrantly Live (2016) – DVD only

The Poet & the Dragon 

 Live... Somewhere in this World... (2004)

The Tyla J. Pallas Band

Albums 

 The Extraordinary Thin Line between Love and Hate (2016)

Live 

 Live (2016)

Tyla's Dogs D'Amour

Albums 

 Homesick Angel EP (2018)
 In Vino Veritas (2018)
 In Musica Veritas (2018)
 In Vino Veritas: Acoustica (2018)
 Jack O'Byte Bluesy Vol. I (2019)
 A Graveyard Of Empty Bottles MMXIX (2019)
 Straight Up 2020 (2020)

Singles 

 Black Confetti (2018)
 Devil's Flynn (2019)
 Lightnin' Bar Blues (2020)
 Superhuman (Charity Single) (2020)

EPs 

 I Don't Love Anyone (2018)
 (Everybody Needs) A Friend (2019)
 The Powder Dry EP (2020)

Live 

 Live (2018)
 In Vino Verilivicus: Live in Londinium MMXIX (2019)

Solo

Albums 

 The Life & Times of a Ballad Monger (1994)
 Libertine (1996)
 Gothic (1997)
 Nocturnal Nomad (1999)
 The Idle Gait of the Self Possessed (2000)
 Lullabies for Tough Guys (2001)
 Life or Death? (2002)
 Passion, Loyalty and Betrayal (2003)
 Fakin' Kant (2004)
 As It Was How It Is Vol. 1 (2005)
 As It Was How It Is Vol. 2 (2005)
 XIII Shades of Black (2005)
 Mightier Than the Sword V.1 (2006)
 Mightier Than the Sword V.2 (2006)
 Gabriel O'Keefe: Heart Of Darkness (2007)
 In Life...In Love...In Dreams (2007)
 Bloody Hell Fire (2009)
 Tyla Presents.. In the Dynamite Jet Saloon MMX (2011)
 Quinquaginta (2011)
 A Graveyard of Empty Bottles MMXII (2012)
 The Devils Supper: Acoustic Version (2013)
 The Devils Supper: Electric Sitting (2013)
 Charmed (2013)
 The State We're In (2014)
 Another Day Abandoned In Pursuit Of Pleasure (2014)
 The Chard Urton Blues Treasury Vol. I (2014)
 The Chard Urton Blues Treasury Vol. II (2014)
 The Chard Urton Blues Treasury Vol. III (2014)
 The Chard Urton Blues Treasury Vol. IV (2014)
 The Chard Urton Blues Treasury Vol. V (2015)
 The Chard Urton Blues Treasury Vol. VI (2015)
 Gold Rings (2015)
 XIII Shades of Dog (2015)
 Balancing the Ships of Honour (2015)
 XIII Shades of Dog Vol. II (2015)
 Nocturnal Nomad: Electric (2015)
 Connoisseur of Junk: Acoustic (2017)
 Connoisseur of Junk: Electric (2017)
 Jacobites Revenge (2017)
 Vampyres 8 Ball (2017)

Singles 

 Bess (2009)

EPs 

 Electric Hellfire Sessions (2010)
 From Dust To Diamonds (2013)

Demos 

 Nocturnal Nomad Demos 1997 (1998)
 Supreme Demos (2009)
 111: Acoustic Sessions MMVII (2018)
 Tyla Demo Tapes: Circa MCMXCV – MMI (2019)
 Isolation Crossing Demos Vol. I (2020)
 Isolation Crossing Demos Vol. II – Mayday! (2020)
 Isolation Crossing Demos Vol. III – El Dia De Los Muertos (2020)

Live 

 Live Acoustic (1999)
 Live MMIX (2010) – Limited to pledge campaign for In The Dynamite Jet Saloon MMX
 Live In London MMXIII (2013)
 Nights Of The Ballad Monger (2014)
 Live in New York City '93 (2018)
 Strings, Clarets & Quills (2019)
 Live in Tokyo (2020)

Compilations 

 Iliad of a Wolverhampton Wanderer (1999)
 A Piece For The Wicked Vol. 1 (1999)
 Double 'T''' (2001)
 Treasure Chest (2001)
 1994–2014: The Best Of The Nineties And Naughties (2015)
 A Treasury Of The King Outlaw (2015)

 Spoken Word 

 A Little Snifter (2012)
 Grub (2012)
 Clobber (2012)
 Ailments (2013)
 It's Bad Luck To Be Superstitious (2018)
 Dead Men Sing No Tales (2020)

 Guest appearances 
Jacobites – slide on "Hurt Me More", "Silver Street" & "Hanging Out The Banners" from Jacobites; "All the Dark Rags", "Sloth", "One More String of Pearls", "I Am Just a Broken Heart" & "Only Children Sleeping" from Robespierre's Velvet BasementBackyard Babies – co-writing lyrics for "Painkiller" from Making Enemies Is Good, "Friends" from Stockholm SyndromeMatty James – slide guitar and vocals on "Last One To Die" from Last One To Die'' (2014)

External links 
Tyla's official website
Sleaze Roxx 2009 Tyla interview
Tyla's Art Tavern

Living people
English male singers
Musicians from Wolverhampton
1960 births